Water sleeves refer to white silk extensions to the cuff of garment sleeves used in Chinese opera. They are worn by both male and female characters of the higher social class. They are so named because performers can use them to produce movements like the ripples of water.

The handling of water sleeves to express different feelings is a difficult technique which takes years to master.

History
Although long and wide sleeves were used by imperial Chinese politicians for centuries, water sleeves did not appear in Chinese theatre until the Ming dynasty (1368–1644). They were extensions of the 1-inch cuff in regular dresses, which protected the sleeves from wear and tear. Originally water sleeves were made of cloth, but these were replaced by silk ones in later years.

Techniques
Water sleeves are used to express elegance and emotions, whose techniques will require years of rigorous training to master. The most common basic water sleeves skills include the transition sleeve, the aside sleeve, the hiding sleeve, the angry sleeve, the sending-away sleeve, the female greeting sleeve, the male greeting sleeve, the dusting sleeve, the signifying sleeve, the decision sleeve, the sheltering sleeve, the running sleeve, the weeping sleeve, the friendly sleeve, the beginning sleeve, the alerting sleeve, the masculine sleeve, and the ghost sleeve. In general, water sleeves can emphasize the movements of the arms and hands, such as pointing to an object. They are also used to cover the face when crying, eating or laughing. When water sleeves are in repose, skillful performers will fold them in accordion pleats on the forearms with a few flicks of the wrists.

Variation
Nowadays, the longest water sleeves are found in Jilin opera, and the shortest in Sichuan opera.

See also 

 Chinese opera
 Chinese opera costume

References

Chinese opera
Chinese traditional clothing